Spodnje Duplje ( or) is a settlement in the Municipality of Naklo in the Upper Carniola region of Slovenia.

Name
Spodnje Duplje was attested in historical sources as Burla in 1209, Duplach between 1205 and 1208, niderm Devplach in 1348, and Tewͦpplach in 1348, among other spellings.

Church

The local church is dedicated to Saint Vitus.

References

External links

Spodnje Duplje on Geopedia

Populated places in the Municipality of Naklo